Jacob "Lew" Meehl is a retired American soccer midfielder who played in the North American Soccer League, Major Indoor Soccer League and American Soccer League.  He coached at the collegiate level for 26 years before retiring in 2009.

Player

Youth
In 1964, Meehl graduated from Frankford High School where he played both soccer and baseball.  He attended Temple University where he played on the soccer team from 1965 to 1967.  He was a 1965 and 1966 Honorable Mention (third team) and 1967 First Team All American.  He graduated in 1969 and was inducted into the Temple Owls Hall of Fame in 1986.

Professional
In 1969, Meehl signed with the Philadelphia Spartans of the American Soccer League.  In 1973, he moved to the Philadelphia Atoms of the North American Soccer League where he was part of the 1973 NASL championship team.  He returned to the ASL in 1975 with the Pittsburgh Miners and the New Jersey Americans in 1976.  In 1978, he joined the Philadelphia Fever of the Major Indoor Soccer League for one season.

Coach
Meehl served as an assistant coach with the Philadelphia Fever during the 1978–1979 MISL season.  In 1981, Meehl coached Philadelphia Bayern to the finals of the National Amateur Cup.  he became an assistant coach with the Princeton Tigers men's soccer team in 1982.  In 1984, he was hired as head coach of the men's soccer team by Philadelphia College of Textiles.  In 1993, he left Philadelphia Textile after compiling a 103–52–23 record.  That year, he became the head coach at Drexel University.   He resigned as head coach on December 31, 2009.  He compiled a 133–150–31 record over 17 seasons.
In 2001, he retired after 32 years as a health and physical education teacher at Bensalem High School.

References

External links
 Philadelphia Atoms roster
 NASL/MISL stats

1954 births
Living people
Sportspeople from Philadelphia
Soccer players from Philadelphia
American soccer coaches
American soccer players
American Soccer League (1933–1983) players
Major Indoor Soccer League (1978–1992) players
Drexel Dragons men's soccer coaches
New Jersey Americans (ASL) players
North American Soccer League (1968–1984) players
Philadelphia Atoms players
Philadelphia Fever (MISL) players
Philadelphia Spartans players
Pittsburgh Miners players
Temple Owls men's soccer players
Association football midfielders